Joseph Barker House may refer to:

Judge Joseph Barker House
Colonel Joseph Barker House